Elsie is an unincorporated community in Clatsop County, Oregon, United States. It is located in the Northern Oregon Coast Range, west of the junction of Oregon Route 103 and U.S. Route 26 where the roads cross the Nehalem River.

Elsie was named after Elsie Foster, who was a relative of George Gragg, the first postmaster. Elsie post office was established in 1892 and closed in 1943.

Camp 18 is a restaurant and logging museum in Elsie. The restaurant is built in the style of a log cabin, using local timber. The building includes an 85-foot ridge pole and front doors that weigh 500 pounds each.

References

External links

Photo of the confluence of West and East Humbug creeks at Elsie by Ian Sane
Elsie history from VanNatta Brothers Logging
Article about Camp 18 from Via, the AAA magazine

Populated places established in 1892
Unincorporated communities in Clatsop County, Oregon
1892 establishments in Oregon
Unincorporated communities in Oregon